Pedajamäe is a village in Otepää Parish, Valga County in Estonia.

References

Villages in Valga County